Brenton Grove (born 9 April 1997 in Melbourne) is a racing driver from Australia. He currently competes in the 2021 GT World Challenge Australia for Grove Racing. During the 2019 season Brenton and his father Stephen represented Australia in the 2019 FIA Motorsport Games GT Cup, finishing 3rd overall.

Racing record

Career summary

Complete Australian Formula 4 Championship results 
(key) (Races in bold indicate pole position) (Races in italics indicate fastest lap)

Complete Super2 Series results
(key) (Round results only)

Complete Bathurst 12 Hour results

References

External links
 
 Profile at Racing Reference
 Brenton Grove V8 Supercars Official Profile
 News, pictures & video's at Motorsport.com
 News, pictures & video's at Speedcafe.com

Australian racing drivers
1997 births
Living people
FIA Motorsport Games drivers
Porsche Supercup drivers
24H Series drivers
Porsche Motorsports drivers
Australian F4 Championship drivers